Daniel Narcisse (born 16 December 1979) is a retired French handball player and French international from 2000 to 2017. He is a double Olympic champion, quadruple World champion and triple European champion, one of the most awarded French team handball players with nine international titles. He progresses to the position of half-center or rear left.

In 2012, with an exceptional year both in the French team (Olympic title) and in the club (Champions League, German championship and German cup), he was voted best handball player of the year 2012 by the International Handball Federation.

Career
Narcisse joined THW Kiel in 2009, replacing Nikola Karabatic, and has since 2013 played for Paris Handball.

Narcisse is a longtime player on the France men's national handball team, and won with it all major titles: world title (in 2001, 2009, 2015 and 2017), European title (in 2006, 2010 and 2014) and Olympic gold medal (in 2008 and 2012). His main strength as a field player is his jumping ability, enabling him to score goals above interfering defense players. This ability earned him the nickname Air France.

Narcisse  was voted into the All star team at the 2008 European Men's Handball Championship, where France finished third. In 2012 he was named the IHF World Player of the Year.

References

External links 

 
 Daniel Narcisse at Ligue Nationale de Handball 
 
 
 

1979 births
Living people
Sportspeople from Saint-Denis, Réunion
French male handball players
Handball players from Réunion
Handball players at the 2004 Summer Olympics
Handball players at the 2008 Summer Olympics
Handball players at the 2012 Summer Olympics
Handball players at the 2016 Summer Olympics
Olympic handball players of France
Olympic gold medalists for France
Olympic silver medalists for France
Olympic medalists in handball
Expatriate handball players
French expatriate sportspeople in Germany
Medalists at the 2016 Summer Olympics
Medalists at the 2012 Summer Olympics
Medalists at the 2008 Summer Olympics
European champions for France
VfL Gummersbach players
THW Kiel players
Handball-Bundesliga players